is a fishing video game developed by Tose and published by ASCII Entertainment and North America by Agetec in 1999.

Reception

The game received above-average reviews according to the review aggregation website GameRankings. In Japan, Famitsu gave it a score of 28 out of 40.

Sequels
There are two sequels to the game: Bass Landing 2, released in 2000-2001, and Bass Landing 3, which was only released in Japan for PlayStation 2 in 2003, and developed by Sammy Corporation.

See also
Bass Rise

Notes

References

External links
 
 Bass Landing at GameFAQs
 Bass Landing 2 at GameFAQs
 Bass Landing 3 at GameFAQs

1999 video games
2000 video games
2003 video games
Agetec games
ASCII Corporation games
Fishing video games
Bass Landing & Bass Landing 2
PlayStation (console)-only games
Bass Landing 3
Single-player video games
Tose (company) games
Video games developed in Japan